Before the French Revolution, the municipality of Bordeaux was headed by the jurat. The first mayor of Bordeaux was elected in 1794.

List

Chief-Jurats (1208–1244)
 Pierre Lambert (1208) 
 Pierre Andron (1218) 
 Bernard d'Acra (1219) 
 Guillaume-Raimond Colom (1220) 
 Pierre Béguey (1222)
 Amanieu Colom (1227)
 Alexandre de Cambes (1228)
 Guillaume Rostan (1229)
 Raimond Monadey (1230)
 Amanieu Lambert (1231)
 Vigouroux Béguey (1232)
 Gaucelm Colom (1233)
 Raimond Monadey (1234)
 Pierre Caillau, le Prud'homme (1235)
 Vigouroux Béguey (1236)
 Rostand del Soler le Prud'homme (mars 1238)
 Raimond Manadey  (décembre 1238)
 Bernard d'Ailhan (1240)
 Martin Faure le Prud'homme (1241)
 Rostand del Soler, le Prud'homme (1241)
 Pierre Béguey, fils de Pierre (1242)
 Guillaume Gondaumer (1243-1244)

Perpetual Mayors (1244–1790)

Mayors (1790–1796)

Amalgamation (1797–1801)
In 1797, the office of Mayor was divided in three arrondissement-mayors: the North (1st Arrondissement), the South (2nd Arrondissement) and the Center (3rd Arrondissement).

The arrondissements' mayors were abolished in 1801, but the Mayor's office was re-introduced only in 1805, during the First Empire.

Mayors (1805–present)

Bordeaux
Bordeaux